The Somerset Senior Vase is an annual rugby union knock-out club competition organized by the Somerset Rugby Football Union.  It was first introduced during the 2007-08 season, with the inaugural winners being Wells.  It is the second most important rugby union cup competition in Somerset, behind the Senior Cup.

The Senior Vase is currently open to club sides based in Somerset and parts of Bristol that are outside of the top 16 teams in the county, typically playing in tier 7 (Tribute Western Counties North, tier 8 (Tribute Somerset Premier) and tier 9 (Somerset 1) of the English rugby union league system.  While the Somerset leagues have 1st and 2nd XV taking part in league games, like the Somerset Senior Cup, the Vase only allows 1st teams to enter.  The format is a knockout cup with a quarter-finals, semi-finals and a final to be held at a neutral venue between March-May.

Somerset Senior Vase winners

Number of wins
Chew Valley (2)
Tor (2)
Wellington (2)
Bristol Harlequins (1)
Burnham-on-Sea (1)
Gordano (1)
Midsomer Norton (1)
Wells (1)
Yatton (1)

Notes

See also
 Somerset RFU
 Somerset Senior Cup
 English rugby union system
 Rugby union in England

References

External links
 Somerset RFU

Recurring sporting events established in 2007
2007 establishments in England
Rugby union cup competitions in England
Rugby union in Somerset